Robert Lachenay (1930–2005) was a French film critic and film crew member. He was François Truffaut's childhood friend and the inspiration for the character René Bigey in the first two films of the Antoine Doinel film series.

Lachenay attended the same schools as Truffaut, and often let Truffaut stay at his family's home. When interviewed in the documentary François Truffaut: Portraits volés, Lachenay claimed that, unlike the film The 400 Blows, he was more often the leader and troublemaker, with Truffaut as his sidekick.

Lachenay was credited as a film critic who wrote articles for Cahiers du cinéma. However, Truffaut occasionally published under the alias "Robert Lachenay".

Lachenay later worked as a crew member on the early films of Truffaut and Jacques Rivette. He wrote and directed one short film, Le scarabée d'or in 1961, based on an Edgar Allan Poe story.

He died of a heart attack at the age of 75.

Filmography
 Une Visite (1955) – Production Assistant
 Le coup du berger (1956) – Camera Assistant
 Les mistons (1957) – Production Manager
 The 400 Blows (1959) – Assistant Unit Manager
 Paris nous appartient (1960) – Unit Manager
 Tire-au-flanc 62 (1960) – Actor
 Le scarabée d'or (1961) – Writer, Director
 François Truffaut: Correspondance à une voix (1988) – Documentary
 François Truffaut: Portraits volés (1993) – Documentary
 François Truffaut, une autobiographie (2004) – Documentary

External links
 

French film critics
1930 births
2005 deaths
French male non-fiction writers
20th-century French male writers